A two-dimensional graph may refer to 
 The graph of a function of one variable
 A planar graph
 A diagram in a plane